Stevan Stojanović (1833–37) or Stefan Stojanović, nicknamed Ćosa, was a Serbian military commander, a colonel (pukovnik) by rank. As the commander of the Danube–Timok Army ( 1836), he reported to Serbian Prince Miloš Obrenović about events in the bordering areas in the Ottoman Empire. He was sent together with minister Avram Petronijević to Knjaževac in early May 1836 to negotiate the return of refugees from Pirot that had fled Ottoman oppression. Despite talks, the Pirot area villagers, rallied by their priests, rose up (24 May–early June 1836). At the end of 1836, Stojanović made a detailed report regarding military matters of the Serbian–Ottoman border.

References

Sources

19th-century Serbian people
Serbian military personnel
People from the Principality of Serbia
Year of birth unknown
19th-century deaths
Year of death unknown